Enoch Storer (18 May 1838 – 1 July 1880) was an English cricketer who played first-class cricket for Lancashire between 1865 and 1878.

Storer was born at Clay Cross, Derbyshire. He became a cricket professional at Ashton-under-Lyne in 1861. In 1863 he played for Boughton and in 1864 spent a year at Exeter College, Oxford. At the end of the 1864 season he moved on the Longsight Club at Manchester. He made his debut for Lancashire in the club's second first-class match which was against Middlesex in August 1865. He accompanied three amateurs from Longsight -  Edwin Bousfield, Lewis Moorsom and R.Slater He scored 6 not out and 23, and took one wicket for 29 runs. In 1866 he was playing for Kendal and Players of Lancashire. He played two matches for Lancashire in 1867 and one in 1868. In 1869 he umpired two first-class Lancashire matches and was with the Manchester Club. From 1870 to 1875 he was at Bury. In 1877 he was with the Broughton Club at Manchester and started umpiring Lancashire matches again at Old Trafford. He returned to the Manchester Club in 1878 and in addition to umpiring, he played two matches for Lancashire in the season. In his last match he achieved his best bowling performance against his native county, Derbyshire when he took  five wickets for 12 runs in the first innings and three for 25 in the second innings.
 
Storer was a left-hand batsman and played eleven innings in six first-class matches with an average of 7.66 and a top score of 23. He was a  right-arm round arm fast bowler and took 15 wickets at an average of 16.33 and a best performance of 5 for 12. He usually fielded at slip where he took two catches.

Storer died at Hulme, Lancashire at the age of 42 and a charity match was played on behalf of his wife and children on 30 April 1881.

References

1838 births
1880 deaths
English cricketers
Lancashire cricketers